Schefflera straminea is a species of flowering plant in the family Araliaceae. It is endemic to Papua New Guinea.

References 

straminea
Flora of Papua New Guinea